Vicinity Energy is the largest district energy provider in the United States. Headquartered in Boston, it is a subsidiary of Antin Infrastructure Partners. It launched at the beginning of 2020 on Antin's purchase of Veolia's U.S. 18 district energy assets in 11 cities for $1.25 billion, and has acquired further systems since.

Assets acquired from Veolia include:
 The 163MW natural-gas Grays Ferry co-generation plant in Philadelphia serving over 400 buildings, including Walnut Street Theatre
 The district energy plant in Tulsa, Oklahoma serving 27 buildings in Downtown Tulsa. 
 The 232MW natural-gas Kendall Cogeneration Station serving Boston and Cambridge with over 65 million square feet of buildings among over 230 customers
 The 5MW Hickory Meadows landfill-gas-to-energy facility in Hilbert, Wisconsin
 Natural-gas cogeneration plant in Kansas City, Missouri to over 4 million square feet of buildings
 Natural-gas cogeneration plant in Grand Rapids to over 100 buildings
 Three networks in Baltimore to over 30 million square feet of buildings, including Walters Art Museum and Mercy Medical Center

Later acquisitions:
 Watergate complex's Watergate Energy Collaborative Utility, acquired June 17, 2020
 West Virginia University's natural gas-powered steam system, acquired July 6, 2020
In April 2022, The Boston Globe reported Vicinity was launching eSteam, a first-of-its-kind innovation in the United States designed to rapidly decarbonize the highest source of emissions in commercial buildings. The company became the first in the U.S. to electrify its operations, offering renewable thermal energy by installing electric boilers, industrial-scale heat pumps, and thermal storage at its central facilities starting in Boston and Cambridge.

Officers 
 William DiCroce, president and CEO
 Matt O'Malley, chief sustainability officer

References 

American companies established in 2020
Electric power companies of the United States